Captain Planet and the Planeteers is an American animated environmentalist superhero television series created by Barbara Pyle and Ted Turner and developed by Pyle, Nicholas Boxer, Thom Beers, Andy Heyward, Robby London, Bob Forward and Cassandra Schafausen. The series was produced by Turner Program Services and DIC Enterprises and broadcast on TBS and in syndication from September 15, 1990, to December 5, 1992.  A sequel series, The New Adventures of Captain Planet, was produced by Hanna-Barbera Cartoons, Inc., distributed by Turner Program Services and broadcast from September 11, 1993, to May 11, 1996. The series was rerun in later years on Cartoon Network and Boomerang. The program is a form of edutainment and advocates environmentalism and is known for having a number of famous actors providing voices for the villains. The show spawned a franchise consisting of a charity, and video games.

Plot

Every episode is followed up with at least one "Planeteer Alert" clip, often connected to the plot, where environmental-political and other social-political issues are discussed and how the viewer can contribute and be part of "the solution" rather than "the pollution".

Characters

Gaia
Gaia (voiced by Whoopi Goldberg in seasons 1–3, Margot Kidder in seasons 4–6), is the spirit of the planet who sends five magic rings—four with the power to control an element of nature and one controlling the element of Heart—to five chosen youths across the globe. She claims to have been asleep for the entire 20th Century and awoken to see a more polluted world than when she was last awake, however this is contradicted by a flashback episode set in the 1920s in which people get guidance from Gaia.

Her physical manifestation is that of a beautiful black woman. In the two-part episode "Summit to Save Earth" where her rival Zarm had defeated her, Gaia was shown as an old, frail woman, with Zarm explaining that given the Earth's several billion years of existence, it would make sense for Gaia to be superannuated in appearance.

Captain Planet
In situations that the Planeteers cannot resolve alone, they can combine their planetary powers to summon the titular Captain Planet (voiced by David Coburn), who is Ma-Ti's magnified heart power in the form of a male blue-skinned superhero avatar with green mullet, possessing all of the other Planeteers' amplified powers, along with more classical superhero powers such as flight, superhuman strength and invulnerability. Once his work is done, Captain Planet returns to the planet, and leaves viewers with the message: "The power is yours!" Typically, Planet only manifests to deal with the bigger crisis and then departs, but a few storylines have explored him existing beyond these moments, such as when he was summoned while Kwame and Ma-Ti were in space, with the result that the energy from their rings that created Planet could not return to its source, resulting in Planet being forced to operate on a human level, such as requiring a crowbar and handcuff keys to rescue the rest of the team.

Planeteers

The Planeteers are tasked with helping defend the planet from environmental disasters and making efforts to educate humankind to keep others from happening. In the beginning of the episodes, Gaia uses her "Planet Vision" in the Crystal Chamber to discover where the most devastating destruction is occurring (in most episodes one or more of the Eco-Villains is behind it) and sends the Planeteers to help solve the problem. The Planeteers use transportation (usually a flying machine called a Geo-Cruiser) based on solar power to avoid causing pollution themselves.

 Kwame (voiced by LeVar Burton) – Hailing from Africa, Kwame possesses the power of earth.
 Wheeler (voiced by Joey Dedio) – From Brooklyn, New York City, United States, Wheeler controls the power of fire. 
 Linka (voiced by Kath Soucie) – From the Soviet Union (Seasons 1 and 2) and Eastern Europe (Seasons 3-6), Linka has the power of wind.
 Gi (voiced by Janice Kawaye) – Hailing from Asia, Gi controls the power of water. 
 Ma-Ti (voiced by Scott Menville) – From Brazil, Ma-Ti wields the power of heart. 
 Suchi (vocal effects provided by Frank Welker) – Ma-Ti's pet spider monkey.

Villains

Eco-Villains

The Eco-Villains are a small group of antagonists who cause danger to the planet through pollution, deforestation, poaching, and other environmentally unsafe activities. They enjoy the destruction they cause to the planet and the harm they bring to obtain wealth, land, or power. The Eco-Villains tend to work alone most of the time, although they're willing to work with one another when it suits their plans. When the Eco-Villains are defeated by Captain Planet and the Planeteers, they would mostly be arrested by the authorities. Only in the two-part episode "Summit to Save Earth" did the entire ensemble of Eco-Villains work as a team with Zarm as the leader. Each of these villains represents a specific way of thought that can cause ecological problems.

 Hoggish Greedly (voiced by Ed Asner) – A pig-like human who represents the dangers of overconsumption and greed, Hoggish is the first villain Captain Planet and the Planeteers encounter. In the episode "Smog Hog", it's revealed Hoggish has a son named Hoggish Greedly Jr. (voiced by Charlie Schlatter) who appears only once and had gotten affected by his polluting Road Hog plot. Because of this, Greedly had to work with Captain Planet to save his son's life. In the episode "Hog Tide," it is revealed that he has a grandfather named Don Porkaloin (portrayed as a parody of Vito Corleone from The Godfather and also voiced by Ed Asner) who in the past was defeated by another group of Planeteers. Unlike Hoggish Greedly, Porkaloin became environmentally friendly as shown in the episode "The Ghost of Porkaloin Past".
 Rigger (voiced by John Ratzenberger) – Greedly's main henchman. He once claimed in "The Ghost of Porkaloin Past" that the main reason he works for Greedly is because no one else would hire him. He does sometime question Greedly's orders and shows concern when Greedly's actions hurt the environment though it never has any effect on his boss, and Rigger, for the most part, remains loyal to Greedly. Rigger does all the leg-work while Greedly usually sits around and eats.
 Verminous Skumm (voiced by Jeff Goldblum in season 1, Maurice LaMarche in season 2–5) – The second villain to appear on the series, he is a part-human, part-rat creature who represents urban blight, disease, and drug abuse. Skumm can control rats and has his own personal helicopter called The Scum O'Copter. Skumm is responsible for the death of Linka's cousin Boris via drugs in the episode "Mind Pollution". In some of the later episodes, Verminous Skumm partook in war profiteering when selling weapons to different gangs.
 Rat Pack – A group of humanoid rats that work for Verminous Skumm.
 Duke Nukem (voiced by Dean Stockwell in seasons 1-3, Maurice LaMarche in seasons 4-6) – A doctor who changed himself into a radioactive yellow rock-skinned mutant who represents the misuse of nuclear power, and the third villain to appear. He is one of the few Eco-Villains, along with Zarm and Captain Pollution, able to battle Captain Planet one-on-one. Nukem generates radiation to fire off radioactive blasts from his hands and possesses X-Ray vision. Apogee temporarily renamed the eponymous character of the Duke Nukem computer game franchise to "Duke Nukum" so as to avoid any possible trademark claims they could face from the producers of Captain Planet. The character was later found to be under no trademark and the games were restored to their original titles.
 Leadsuit (voiced by Frank Welker) – Duke Nukem's henchman, Leadsuit's name defines his appearance as he wears a full-bodied lead hazmat suit to withstand the radiation released by Duke Nukem's body. He revealed that he works for Duke Nukem because when Nukem takes over the world, he'll get to be second-in-command. Leadsuit is timid, rarely arguing with Nukem (and always losing if he objects to anything). Leadsuit is afraid of the dark and usually gives in at the slightest trouble.
 Dr. Barbara "Babs" Blight (voiced by Meg Ryan in 1990–1991, Mary Kay Bergman in 1992–1996, Tessa Auberjonois in OK K.O.! Let's Be Heroes) – The fourth villain revealed, Dr. Blight is a mad scientist who represents the dangers of uncontrolled technology and unethical scientific experimentation. As a result of self-experimentation, the left half of her face is horribly scarred and is usually hidden by her hair. In the episode "Hog Tide," it is revealed that Dr. Blight had a grandmother named Betty Blight who assisted Don Porkaloin in his plot. In the episode "Hollywaste", it is revealed that Dr. Blight has a sister named Bambi (voiced by Kath Soucie). Bambi calls Blight by her nickname "Babs", but is called "the Headache Woman" in her Eco-Villain name.
 MAL (voiced by David Rappaport in 1990, Tim Curry in 1991–1996) – Dr. Blight's artificially intelligent husband and henchman. He has the ability to hack into other computer systems, take over them and reprogram them mainly to Dr. Blight's specifications. MAL is often the control and main power source of everything in Dr. Blight's labs as well as the vehicles she travels in.
 Looten Plunder (voiced by James Coburn in seasons 1-3, Ed Gilbert in seasons 4-6) – A wealthy poacher and crooked businessman who represents the evils of unethical business actions. Looten is the sixth villain to appear on Captain Planet in the seventh episode, "The Last of Her Kind". He is also shown to have a nephew named Robin Plunder. His name was a play on the term "Loot and Plunder", and he was always in the ending credits of every episode when the singer mentioned "Bad guys who like to loot and plunder!", taken from footage of one episode where a disshelved Plunder sees his scheme in ruins and screams "You will pay for this, Captain Planet!". Plunder is the only eco-villain to come out on top as seen in "Whoo Gives a Hoot" where the Planeteers lose after failing to provide proof to a judge that Plunder was illegally cutting down trees in an old-growth forest.
 Argos Bleak (voiced by S. Scott Bullock) – Looten Plunder's main henchman and bodyguard, he also functions as a mercenary and carries out most of Plunder's dirty work. Argos seems to have a military background as he is seen in many episodes flying helicopters or other aircraft, and is proficient in handling firearms. Argos even got his own episode "The Preditor", where he appeared without his boss to hunt down sharks. Another time where Plunder conspired with Hoggish Greedily, Argos Bleak was seen arguing with Rigger as to who was the better Eco-Villain.
 Pinehead Brothers (voiced by Dick Gautier and Frank Welker) – Oakey and Dokey are two oversized lumberjacks that are Looten Plunder's henchmen in the final season of "The New Adventures of Captain Planet."
 Sly Sludge (voiced by Martin Sheen in Seasons 1–3, Jim Cummings in Seasons 4–6) – An unscrupulous waste collector who represents laziness, ignorance, and the dangers of apathy and short-term thinking. However, as many of his schemes involve waste management, which is a legitimate environmental issue, he often uses that to gain apparent respectability. Sludge is the last villain to be revealed. He is also the only main villain to defect to the Planeteers where a recycling program of his makes a lot of money by the end of "No Small Problem." The money enables Sludge to propose plans to mass-produce an affordable, eco-friendly way to safely dispose of waste.
 Ooze (voiced by Cam Clarke) – Sly Sludge's henchman. He is often underpaid and works for Sludge because he has no other option. Like Rigger, Ooze does most of the heavy work while his boss watches.
 Tank Flusher III (voiced by Frank Welker) – Sly Sludge's strongman servant who makes his debut in "The New Adventures of Captain Planet" episode "A Mine is a Terrible Thing to Waste" Pt. 1 where he answered an ad for "A heinous henchman to serve a Machiavellian master" even though he doesn't know what it means.
 Zarm (voiced by Sting in 1990–1992, David Warner in 1992, Malcolm McDowell in 1993–1995) – A former spirit of the planet who left Gaia in search of other worlds and ended up laying other populous planets to ruin lacking Gaia to balance out his methods. He represents war and destruction. Even though Zarm does not have any henchmen of his own, he would often manipulate other people to do his bidding. He once united Hoggish Greedly, Looten Plunder, Sly Sludge, Duke Nukem, Verminous Skumm, and Dr. Blight under his leadership in the two-part episode "Summit to Save Earth." Other times he recruits and manipulates others, even the Planeteers, to work for him. Zarm is the fifth Eco-Villain to appear in the series, having his first appearance in the sixth episode. Outside of war and destruction, Zarm promoted hatred and totalitarianism, which he believed were the most dangerous pollutants to mankind, as evidenced by his acting as kingmaker to a dictator named Morgar. Zarm admits he has been a guiding force for every despot of the 20th century, but admits one of them actually declined his help and challenges the Planeteers to guess who, saying "I think you'll be pleasantly surprised."

Captain Pollution
A polluting counterpart to Captain Planet named Captain Pollution (voiced by David Coburn, like his good counterpart) appears in the two-part episode "Mission to Save Earth" when Dr. Blight steals the Planeteers' rings, creates polluting duplicates of them, and distributes the duplicates to most of the other Eco-villains. Each Eco-villain received a specific ring which had the opposite power of the Planeteers:

 Duke Nukem has a Super Radiation Ring (counterpart of Fire).
 Looten Plunder has a Deforestation Ring (counterpart of Earth).
 Sly Sludge has a Smog Ring (counterpart of Wind).
 Verminous Skumm has a Toxics Ring (counterpart of Water).
 Dr. Blight has a Hate Ring (counterpart of Heart).

Each of the evil rings has malevolent faces on them, in contrast to the more element-themed Planeteer rings. Captain Pollution is weakened when he is in contact with pure elements such as clean water or sunlight, while he gains power from contact with pollutants, being able to absorb pollutant and emit radioactive rays (and is later shown to gain limitless power when in contact with pollutants after his resurrection). When he is summoned he says "By your polluting powers combined, I am Captain Pollution! Ha! Ha! Ha! Ha! Ha! Ha!", and when he disappears, he declares "The polluting power is yours!"

In his first appearance, he is sent by the Eco-villains to destroy the Planeteers but gets chased off by Commander Clash, and after a fight with Captain Planet, he returns to the evil rings causing them to explode. In the two-part episode "A Mine is a Terrible Thing to Waste", Captain Pollution is brought back to life by toxins of the five evil rings that seep into the planet.

Captain Pollution is Captain Planet's polar opposite in personality as well as power. In contrast to Planet's generous and altruistic nature, Pollution is lazy, and arrogant, seeing himself as a god and his creators as servants rather than partners. Captain Planet sums up the difference in their outlook during their first battle by taunting that the Planeteers have no boss – they are a team – and this is why Pollution will always lose.

Captain Pollution resembles Captain Planet, but his skin is pale yellow and covered in brown lesions. His hair is red and styled in a Widow's peak and he has red eyes. His costume is the same color and style as Planet's, but the globe on his chest is torn in the middle. His voice is similar to Captain Planet's, but it has a California Valley twang to it. Captain Pollution is defeated twice by Captain Planet; first in "Mission to Save Earth" by being rammed through earth, lava, air and water, and then again in "A Mine is a Terrible Thing to Waste" by being tricked into going into an underground magma chamber.  Captain Pollution is destroyed by Captain Planet who throws Pollution in the water destroying him.

Other villains
 The Slaughters – A family of poachers who made their debut in "The New Adventures of Captain Planet". The Slaughters represent the endangerment of animals and the evils of poaching and are often in direct monetary competition with Looten Plunder. Mame and her family once collaborated with Looten Plunder and Argos Bleak in the episode "Horns A'Plenty" when the Planeteers ruined each one's rhinoceros poaching.
 Mame Slaughter (voiced by Theresa Saldana in the first appearance, Mitzi McCall in the second appearance) – The leader of the Slaughters.
 Stalker Slaughter (voiced by Charlie Adler) – One of Mame's sons and her second-in-command. He has a strong attachment to her as he needs her directions most of the time.

Episodes

Development

Conception
According to Barbara Pyle, the inspiration for the five Planeteers came from real people that she met during the show's pre-production, in 1989. The character "Gi" was inspired by Malaysian environmental activist Chee Yoke Ling of Sahabat Alam Malaysia, while Ma-Ti was inspired on Paulinho Paiakan. Wheeler was said by Pyle to be based on her own father. She reported on making him the most environmentally unaware based on the view she had of the attitudes displayed by the US at the 1992 Rio Earth Summit. Kwame was inspired by the survivors of the Rhodesian Bush War. In a September 2012 interview with Barbara Pyle and co-developer Nicholas Boxer, it was stated that the Hope Island was located near the Bahamas.

DIC history (1990–1992)
The original series was the second longest running US-cartoon of the 1990s, producing 113 episodes. It lasted for three seasons under the name Captain Planet and the Planeteers (produced by TBS Productions and DiC).

The show's intro theme was composed by Tom Worrall. The ending theme (maintained by both DIC and Hanna-Barbera's versions) is considered one of the most memorable parts of the series due to its catchy main chorus and rock track ("Captain Planet, he's our hero, gonna take pollution down to zero"). Its lyrics were written by show producer Nick Boxer and is performed by Murray McFadden and Timothy Mulhollan. During the end credits, James Coburn, in character as Looten Plunder, utters the line "You'll pay for this, Captain Planet.". This is then followed by a rap from the voice actors of the Planeteers. It is akin to New Kids on the Block's "Step By Step".

Hanna-Barbera history (1993–1996)
In 1993, the show saw a production company switch, changing the title to The New Adventures of Captain Planet (produced by Hanna-Barbera Cartoons, which was acquired by Turner in 1991). During this time, it aired as part of TBS'  Sunday Morning in Front Of The TV  block, alongside fellow H-B toons SWAT Kats: The Radical Squadron and 2 Stupid Dogs. This series revealed more of the past of each of the characters and expanded on it dramatically. The tone of these episodes was more mature than the initial series. The animation style was altered.

The DiC seasons' synth-rock soundtrack was replaced by a large number of orchestral pieces, and while the end credits theme was retained, the ending sequence now showcased footage from the Hanna-Barbera episodes. Full-time voice actors replaced most of the major celebrities that had voiced Gaia and the Eco-Villains during the DiC seasons. The opening narration was spoken by David Coburn (Captain Planet) rather than LeVar Burton (Kwame) and, in the final season, was replaced by a rap by Fred Schneider of The B-52's.

Legacy
The Captain Planet Foundation (CPF) was founded in 1991, when series producer Barbara Pyle negotiated a percentage of the show's merchandising revenue to empower young people. The concept allowed schools and organizations around the world to present their environmental projects to the Foundation and receive seed money to grow their ideas. In 2001, Time Warner decided to shut down the CPF due to a challenging merger with AOL. Laura Seydel and her husband Rutherford Seydel worked with Time Warner to orchestrate the transition of the corporate foundation to a public charity – the Captain Planet Foundation. In 2007, CPF acquired the rights to exhibit previous episodes of Captain Planet and the Planeteers online and on-air, thus "allowing this valuable resource to reach out and educate the children of today!" , the organization's board is chaired by Laura Turner Seydel, daughter of Ted Turner; the board includes Barbara Pyle.

It was parodied in Episode 3 Season 5 of Rick and Morty A Rickconvenient Mort.

Reception 

In 1990, The Los Angeles Times described the show as having "not much originality", although also saying that "there’s a passion behind this series, which adapts a conventional super-hero formula to an unconventional theme", also stating that the celebrities voicing the series "also sets the series apart". The newspaper also described the show as being part of "the increased awareness of Earth as endangered". L. Brent Bozell III, a conservative activist, accused the show of "seeking to scare children into political activism", along with accusing the show of having "leftist slants"; Barbara Pyle responded, saying "I don't think 'Captain Planet' is scary ... it shows kids that every action counts ... I consider [environmental issues] bipartisan." Diane Holloway from Austin American-Statesman wrote, "The animation is crude and jerky, but the messages are important and clear enough for a 4-year old to understand", while Rebecca Coudret from Evansville Courier & Press said she "wondered if [children] were simply responding to the basic good vs. evil clash." In 1993, the episode "Dream Machine" won an award at the Environmental Media Awards, and in 1994, the episode  "Gorillas Will Be Missed" likewise did.

Reviewing season one in 2012, IGN gave the show a rating of 5 out of 10, describing the animation as "pretty weak" and the stories as "too hokey".

Educational goals
Various episodes were constructed to touch on relevant themes to a modern audience:

 "Mind Pollution"
The episode titled "Mind Pollution" (1991) was notable for dealing with the issue of drug abuse. This was explained by the fact that the characters thought of drug addiction as "pollution of the mind". The episode revolved around an epidemic of a designer drug known as "Bliss" created by Verminous Skumm. It included a scene of Linka's cousin Boris jumping through a window and dying from a drug overdose.

 "Population Bomb"
"Population Bomb" (1991) continued the trend of tackling controversial subject matter atypical for a children's cartoon, in this instance the problem with overpopulation. Using mice as substitutes for humans, the episode sets Wheeler on a Gulliver's Travels style adventure where he encounters a tribe of sentient mice who are destroyed by overpopulation and irresponsible leadership. It turns out that the ordeal is something that Wheeler dreamed up, though it serves as a warning for the audience about sustainability and over-consumption.

 "A Formula for Hate"
The episode titled "A Formula for Hate" (1992) was also unusual for the series in that it was the first episode in an American children's animated series to directly deal with the HIV/AIDS pandemic. In the episode, Skumm and one of his rat henchmen brainwashes a local community into thinking the virus can be spread through casual contact and thus causing people to hate and fear a young man, infected with HIV, named Todd Andrews (voiced by Neil Patrick Harris, with his mother voiced by Elizabeth Taylor). Captain Planet tells the truth about AIDS to the entire basketball game with help from Todd's coach. Then Captain Planet catches Skumm and his rat henchman and hand him over to the police.

Franchise extension
Pyle and Boxer demanded that the series' merchandise be made sustainably; because of this, several of the companies producing Captain Planet-themed merchandise had to completely overhaul their means of production to manufacture recycled and recyclable products.

Toys
As with many popular cartoons, Captain Planet had a line of action figures and vehicles. Released by Tiger Toys in 1990, the line ran for several years, long enough to tie into the New Adventures series. The toys were repackaged and sold by Grand Toys in Canada and Kenner throughout Europe. The toys were of average poseability, with the common five points – neck, shoulders, and hips.

Finding a comprehensive list of what was released is difficult, since not all toys shown in the initial retailer catalog were even released. The collector's market is small, the toys being somewhat rare on eBay. The Captain Planet Foundation still sells a small number of them online, however. There may have also been further foreign variations of certain toys which may be even more difficult to catalog. Various toys from the New Adventures waves are not as likely to be well known.

The five Planeteers, five Eco-Villains, Commander Clash, and several versions of Captain Planet, each with a different gimmick or paint scheme, were released, along with several vehicles. A toy ring with lights and sound and interchangeable lenses for the five elements was also released. Four small vehicles were also sold through a Burger King promotion.

Video games

A video game based on the series was developed for the Nintendo Entertainment System by Mindscape called Captain Planet. The game, which involved a good deal of shooting, received negative reviews from game critics and thus a Sega Mega Drive (Genesis) version of the game was cancelled. A separate side-scrolling game was developed by Novalogic for the Mega Drive/Genesis, but only saw release in Europe and Australia.

David Perry and Nick Bruty developed a ZX Spectrum and Amstrad CPC game using the license, a 3-level shoot 'em up. A game was also released in 1990 for the Amiga and Atari ST, written by Tony Crowther. This was a platform game and was briefly bundled with the Amiga 500 "Cartoon Classics" pack released in 1991. A Commodore 64 game was in development but never released. Tiger Toys, owners of the action figure license, also created an LCD hand-held game.

Captain Planet appears as a playable character in the fighting game Cartoon Network: Punch Time Explosion for Nintendo 3DS, Wii, PS3, and Xbox 360.

Home media
Turner Home Entertainment originally released VHS tapes of the series, which contained a single episode on each. DIC's main home video distributor Buena Vista Home Video would also release single-episode VHS releases as well.

A DVD with four episodes and bonus features exists but was only available as part of a "Planeteer Pack" purchased from the Captain Planet Foundation.
This promotional DVD contained the episodes "A River Ran Through It", "A Perfect World", "Gorillas Will Be Missed", and "The Big Clam Up". A short clip titled " Planeteers in Action", which is about the Captain Planet Foundation, is also included. The "Planeteer Pack" special is no longer available.

Shout! Factory under license from Turner and Warner Home Video released a DVD set of the complete first season in the U.S. on April 19, 2011. The DVD packaging is made of 100% recycled paper.

Madman Entertainment released the first season on July 6, 2016 and the complete collection on October 25, 2017 in Australia.

As of March 25, 2017, it is available on iTunes for purchase. The whole series was made available on Amazon Instant Video.

Film
Multiple attempts have been made to create a film adaptation of the series. The first occurred in 1996 when Boxer and Pyle wrote a film adaptation of Captain Planet originally titled Planet. Five years later, Michael Reaves revised the concept as Dark Planet or Planet. The storyline was darker than the series, and set in a post-apocalyptic time period. However, the script was lost when Turner and Warner Bros. merged in 1996. The film reached the design stage before it was abandoned.

Other attempts at a film version were made in 2007, 2011, and 2013, but none of these versions came to pass. In October 2016 Paramount Pictures and Leonardo DiCaprio's Appian Way were attempting to develop a new movie and is in negotiations with Jono Matt and Glen Powell to write the script, with Powell to star as the titular character. The status of the project is unclear since there were no further news of film adaptation. Powell claims that hurdles at Warner Bros. Discovery need to be cleared before moving forward.

Comic books
Marvel Comics published a comic series titled Captain Planet and the Planeteers. The series ran twelve issues, cover dated October 1991 through October 1992.

OK K.O.! crossover
In 2017, Captain Planet appeared in a special crossover episode of the Cartoon Network series OK K.O.! Let's Be Heroes, with David Coburn reprising his role as Captain Planet and LeVar Burton reprising his role as Kwame. The heroes battled Dr. Blight (accompanied by a silent MAL). The episode "The Power Is Yours" aired on October 9, 2017 as part of the first season.

References

External links
 Planeteer Movement
 Captain Planet Foundation 
 Captain Planet at Don Markstein's Toonopedia. Archived from the original on April 9, 2012.
 
 
 

 
1990s American animated television series
1990 American television series debuts
1996 American television series endings
American children's animated action television series
American children's animated adventure television series
American children's animated education television series
American children's animated science fantasy television series
American children's animated superhero television series
Eco-terrorism in fiction
Environmental television
English-language television shows
Fictional conservationists and environmentalists
Fictional sextets
Television series by DIC Entertainment
Television series by Hanna-Barbera
Hanna-Barbera superheroes
Marvel Comics superheroes
TBS (American TV channel) original programming
Hanna-Barbera comics
Educational comics
Comics based on television series
Classical mythology in popular culture
Overpopulation fiction
Television series by Studio T
Television series by Warner Bros. Television Studios
Television shows adapted into comics
Television shows adapted into video games
Television shows about drugs